Raccordo autostradale 5 (RA 5) is a motorway that branches off Autostrada A2 through the junction Potenza - Sicignano degli Alburni and joins the SS 407 "Basentana", which is reached after a journey of about 50 kilometers, almost all in Basilicata.

References 

RA05
Transport in Campania
Transport in Basilicata